The 2022 Texas State Bobcats football team represented Texas State University as a member of the Sun Belt Conference during the 2022 NCAA Division I FBS football season. They will be led by head coach Jake Spavital, who will be coaching his fourth season with the team. The Bobcats will play their home games at Bobcat Stadium in San Marcos, Texas.

Preseason

Recruiting class

Sun Belt coaches poll
The Sun Belt coaches poll was released on July 25, 2022. The Bobcats were picked to finish fourth in the West Division.

Sun Belt Preseason All-Conference teams

Offense

1st team
Dalton cooper – Offensive Lineman, SO

2nd team
Kyle hergel – Offensive Lineman, JR

Special teams

1st team
Seth keller – Kicker, JR

Schedule
Texas State and the Sun Belt Conference announced the 2022 football schedule on March 1, 2022.

Game summaries

at Nevada

FIU

at No. 17 Baylor

Houston Christian

at James Madison

Appalachian State

Statistics

at Troy

Southern Miss

at Louisiana-Monroe

at South Alabama

at Arkansas State

Louisiana

References

Texas State
Texas State Bobcats football seasons
Texas State Bobcats football